The Grumman TB2F was a cancelled twin-engined torpedo bomber project, intended as Grumman's successor to the successful TBF Avenger. However, only a mockup was ever constructed.

In 1944, during World War II, the Midway class aircraft carriers were being built, and Grumman attempted to design a new torpedo bomber to accompany those carriers. However, it was soon decided that, among other difficulties, it would be impractical to efficiently deploy twin-engined aircraft of this size from an aircraft carrier, and the plans were shelved.

Specifications

See also

References
Notes

Bibliography
 Johnson, E.R. (2008). American Attack Aircraft Since 1926. Jefferson, NC: McFarland & Company. .
 Pelletier, Alain J. "A Tracker Before Its Time?: Grumman's Heavyweight XTB2F-1". Air Enthusiast, No. 98, March/April 2002. ISSN 0143-5450. pp. 48–53.

TB02F
Cancelled military aircraft projects of the United States
High-wing aircraft
Carrier-based aircraft
Twin piston-engined tractor aircraft